Wilfried Niflore (born 29 April 1981) is a French professional football manager and former player.

Playing career

In France
Born in Toulouse, Niflore began his career at local club Toulouse FC, making his professional debuts in 2001–02. He earned 23 appearances for the club, scored three goals, before moved to AS Cannes in the summer of 2002. In his country Niflore also played for Tours FC and FC Gueugnon, before in January 2008 relocated to Bulgaria.

Litex Lovech
On 10 January 2008, Niflore signed a two-and-a-half-year contract with Litex Lovech. He made his competitive debut for Litex on 1 March 2008 against CSKA Sofia. A few days later, on 8 March Niflore scored his first goal for the club against Vihren Sandanski.

In the 2008–09 season, Niflore's form blossomed as he became first-choice striker due to the departure of Emil Angelov to Denizlispor. In this season, Niflore earned 31 appearances for the club and scored 10 goals.

Wilfried started excellently the 2009–10 season, scoring his first goals of the season in the first round of First Professional Football League on 8 August 2009 in a 5–0 victory over Lokomotiv Mezdra. He scored twice. This season proved to be one of remarkable personal achievements for Niflore. He completed the season as the Professional League's top goal-scorer with 19 goals.

Return to France 
After 94 matches for Litex, in which he scored some 43 goals, Niflore signed for French Championnat National side Nîmes Olympique. He would have spells at Paris FC and Muret before retiring in 2014.

Honours
Litex Lovech
 First Professional Football League: 2009–10
 Bulgarian Cup: 2008, 2009
 Bulgarian Supercup: 2010

Individual
 First Professional Football League top scorer: 2009–10

References

External links

1981 births
Living people
Sportspeople from Toulouse
French footballers
Association football forwards
Ligue 2 players
Championnat National players
First Professional Football League (Bulgaria) players
Toulouse FC players
AS Cannes players
Tours FC players
FC Gueugnon players
Nîmes Olympique players
Paris FC players
PFC Litex Lovech players
AS Muret players
French football managers
French expatriate footballers
French expatriate sportspeople in Bulgaria
Expatriate footballers in Bulgaria